Margaret Walton Mayall (January 27, 1902 – December 6, 1995) was an American astronomer. She was the director of the American Association of Variable Star Observers (AAVSO) from 1949 to 1973.

Mayall (born Margaret Lyle Walton) was born in Iron Hill, Maryland, on 27 January 1902. She attended the University of Delaware, where her interest in astronomy grew after taking math and chemistry courses.  She then moved to Swarthmore College, where she received her Bachelor's Degree in Mathematics in 1924.

She earned an MA in Astronomy from Radcliffe College, Harvard University, in 1928 and worked as a research assistant and astronomer at Harvard College Observatory from 1924 to 1954, initially working with Annie Jump Cannon on classifying star spectra and estimating star brightness. She was a research staff member at the Heat Research Laboratory, Special Weapons Group, Massachusetts Institute of Technology from 1943 to 1946.

While working in Nantucket, she met Robert Newton Mayall, a member of the American Association of Variable Star Observers (AAVSO). They married in 1927.

In 1958 she won the Annie J. Cannon Award in Astronomy.

She died of congestive heart failure in Cambridge, Massachusetts, on 6 December 1995.

References

Further reading

External links
Letters at the AAVSO
Oral history from the American Institute of Physics
The Harold C. Ernst Collection of Portable Sundials

1902 births
1995 deaths
American women astronomers
Recipients of the Annie J. Cannon Award in Astronomy
20th-century American women scientists
People from Cecil County, Maryland
20th-century American scientists
Radcliffe College alumni
Swarthmore College alumni
Harvard College Observatory people